Environmental Pollution is a peer-reviewed academic journal covering the biological, health, and ecological effects of environmental pollution. It was established in 1980 as two parts: Environmental Pollution Series A: Ecological and Biological and Environmental Pollution Series B: Chemical and Physical. These parts were merged in 1987 to form the journal under its current title. It is published by Elsevier and the editors-in-chief are David O. Carpenter (University at Albany, SUNY) and Eddy Y. Zeng (Jinan University). According to the Journal Citation Reports, the journal has a 2020 impact factor of 8.071.

References

External links

Environmental science journals
Publications established in 1980
Elsevier academic journals
English-language journals
Journals published between 13 and 25 times per year